The Trial Islands Ecological Reserve is a nature reserve on the Trial Islands in the British Columbia province of Canada just off the southern tip of Oak Bay  in the Strait of Juan de Fuca. The  twenty-three-hectare ecological reserve was established in 1990 to protect two elongated rocky islands and associated islets. It protects the greatest number of endangered and vulnerable species in a single ecological reserve in British Columbia.

Flora and fauna
Flora on the reserve include great and common camas and stands of wind-adapted Garry oaks that cover the island. Endangered or threatened plants include the white-top aster, paintbrush owl-clover, golden paintbrush, creeping wild rye, rosy owl-clover, California buttercup, snake-root sanicle, purple sanicle, and Scouler's campion. This is the most northern limit of their range for many of these species.  Nine plant communities have been described, including the red-listed Garry oak-California brome association.

The Trial Islands provide roosting sites for cormorants, black oystercatchers, diving ducks, gulls, eagles, raptors, and shorebirds, as well as haul-out sites for sea lions and seals.

See also
 Race Rocks Ecological Reserve

Notes

External links
 Trial Islands Ecological Reserve, British Columbia Parks official website.
Trial Islands Ecological Reserve Friends of Ecological reserves website- contains photos and research documents. 

Greater Victoria
Nature reserves in British Columbia
Gulf Islands